Joseph Kernan was an American professional baseball player. He played second base and center field in two games for the 1873 Baltimore Marylands. He was a Baltimore native like most of his Maryland teammates.

Kernan previously played for the Marylands in the second of their three professional seasons, 1870. While the team won 2 and lost 14 pro matches, he appeared at third base and second base in five of the eleven games on record, and he scored four runs, the lowest rate on the team.

Little is known about baseball in the 1870s, outside the leagues, but it seems sure that many NABBP clubs continued to operate; thus adult players outside the leagues, such as Joe Kernan, continued to play competitively. Kernan may have played for the Marylands between 1870 and 1873.

References

External links

Baltimore Marylands (NABBP) players
Baltimore Marylands players
19th-century baseball players
Year of birth unknown
Year of death unknown
Baseball players from Baltimore